Ahmad Hasan al-Khatib (1933–1982) was a Syrian politician. He was a ceremonial head of state of Syria, appointed by Hafez al-Assad to replace the ousted president Nureddin al-Atassi. Ahmad al-Khatib was a civilian member of the ruling Ba'ath party and served as the country's acting president for only four months. Assad subsequently became president in 1971. He then became the speaker of the Syrian parliament. 

He died in Damascus, Syria in 1982. He had many siblings, one of them was Najwa al-Khatib, the wife of Abdulmajid Mansour, a very important doctor in the Syrian army who died in 2007. 

1933 births
1982 deaths
20th-century Syrian politicians
Presidents of Syria
Speakers of the People's Assembly of Syria
Members of the Regional Command of the Arab Socialist Ba'ath Party – Syria Region